Thomas Low Nichols (1815 – 1901) was an American physician, journalist, writer and advocate for a number of causes including free love, hydrotherapy, food and health reform, vegetarianism and spiritualism.

Biography 
Nichols was born in Orford, New Hampshire, in 1815. He studied medicine at Dartmouth College, until he dropped out and became a radical journalist. Nichols apprenticed on newspapers in Lowell and New York, before becoming an editor and partial proprietor of the Buffalonian in 1837. An article he published while editor of The New York Aurora, led to him serving four months in prison for libel; Nichols later published Journal in Jail, an account of his experience, in 1840.

Thomas Nichols married Mary Gove in July 1848. Nichols completed his MD at New York University in 1850. Later, the couple founded a school for training water-cure therapists and published several books on health, food and other reforms. Nichols was secretary of the American Hygienic and Hydropathic Association and the Society of Public Health and vice-president of the American Vegetarian Society.

Between 1853 and 1857, Nichols published two journals, Nichols' Monthly and Nichols' Journal, to advocate for his beliefs. In Nichols' Monthly, he partially published an epistolary utopian story, which he infused with his beliefs about free love, universal suffrage and libertarianism; it was later published in novel form in 1860.

For some time, the couple lived in Josiah Warren's Modern Times free love anarchist community, based on Long Island. In 1856, the couple left and founded a "school of life", called the Memnonia Institute, based in Yellow Springs, Ohio. It collapsed in 1857 and the couple converted to Roman Catholicism.

The couple relocated to London to escape the American Civil War. Nichols published two further novels Uncle Angus (1864) and Jerry (1872), as well as a best-selling autobiography Forty Years of American Life in 1864. Nichols started the Co-operative Sanitary Company in 1875 and the couple co-founded a health publication, the Herald of Health. The couple campaigned for temperance and dress reform and against military conscription, vivisection, vaccinations and capital punishment. They also helped create several vegetarian restaurants in London.

Mary died in 1884; after her death, Nichols moved to Sutton, Surrey, where he continued to publish his pamphlets.

Nichols later moved to Chaumont-en-Vexin, France, where he died in 1901, at the age of 85.

Legacy 
Animal rights and vegetarianism activist Ernest Bell, credited Nichols' pamphlet How to Live on Sixpence A-day, as the initial inspiration for his vegetarianism.

Selected publications 

 Journal in Jail: Kept During a Four Months' Imprisonment for Libel, in the Jail of Erie County (1840)
 Esoteric Anthropology (The Mysteries of Man) (1853)
 Esperanza: My Journey Thither and What I Found There (1860)
 Forty Years of American Life (1864)
 Uncle Angus (1864)
 Jerry (1872)
 How to Live on Sixpence A-day (1873)
 The Herald of Health (1877)
 Dr. Nichols' Penny Vegetarian Cookery: The Science and the Art of Selecting and Preparing a Pure, Healthful, and Sufficient Diet Illustrated by Food Diagrams and Portraits of Distinguished Vegetarians (1888)
 "MARRIAGE in all Ages and Nations As it Has Been - As it is - As it might be Its History, Physiology, Morals and Laws (Author of Esoteric Anthropology, Human Physiology The Basis of Sanitary and Social Science, Forty Years of American Life, Nichols Health Manual and Memorial etc" London Published for the Author by W Foulsham & Co (Late Catty & Dobson) 4 Pilgrim St Ludgate Hill EC. Roffe & Co Boston Mass USA (1886)

References

Further reading

External links 

 Thomas Low Nichols at the Internet Archive
 Online books by Thomas Low Nichols

1815 births
1901 deaths
19th-century American male writers
Activists from New Hampshire
Alternative cancer treatment advocates
American autobiographers
American health and wellness writers
American pamphleteers
American male non-fiction writers
American prisoners and detainees
American spiritualists
American suffragists
American temperance activists
American vegetarianism activists
American women's rights activists
American anti-vaccination activists
Anti-vivisectionists
Converts to Roman Catholicism
Hydrotherapists
Journalists from New Hampshire
Male feminists
New York University Grossman School of Medicine alumni
Organization founders
People associated with physical culture
People from Orford, New Hampshire
Pseudoscientific diet advocates